Röthke is a German surname.  Notable people with the surname include:

Heinz Röthke (1912–1966), German SS officer
Rene Röthke (born 1982), German ice hockey player
Theodore Roethke (1908–1963), American poet

German-language surnames